Temnora kaguru is a moth of the  family Sphingidae. It is known from Tanzania.

The wingspan is 37–45 mm. It is very similar to Temnora burdoni, but the ground colour of the upperside of the body and wings are a little darker brown red. The forewing outer margin is slightly more incised below the apex than in Temnora uluguru. The hindwing upperside is more reddish than the forewing upperside, with a broad brown marginal band.

References

Temnora
Moths described in 2004